Georgia Elizabeth Tennant (born 25 December 1984) is an English actress and producer. She played Detective Inspector Samantha Nixon's daughter Abigail in The Bill, Jenny in the Doctor Who episode "The Doctor's Daughter" and Lady Vivian in the show Merlin.

Early life
Tennant was born on Christmas Day at Queen Charlotte's and Chelsea Hospital in Hammersmith, West London, the daughter of actors Peter Moffett (known by his stage name, Peter Davison) and Sandra Dickinson. She attended St Edward's School in Oxford.

Career
Tennant made her television debut at the age of 15 in Peak Practice (1999), playing Nicki Davey. Tennant has appeared in television dramas such as The Second Quest and Like Father Like Son. She played downtrodden Alice Harding in the ITV drama Where the Heart Is in 2004 and 2005 and has performed alongside her father in Fear, Stress & Anger  and The Last Detective.

In 2007, she made her theatrical debut as Mathilde Verlaine in Total Eclipse at London's Menier Chocolate Factory. In May 2008, Tennant appeared in the BBC series Doctor Who as the Tenth Doctor's artificially-created daughter, Jenny, in the episode "The Doctor's Daughter", with her future husband David Tennant playing the Doctor (her father Peter Davison played the Fifth Doctor in the 1980s). In August 2008, Tennant starred in series one of BBC Three's spy spin-off Spooks: Code 9 as Kylie Roman.

Tennant voiced the role of Cassie Rice in Doctor Who: Dreamland in 2009, and portrayed Lady Vivian in the "Sweet Dreams" episode of the BBC drama Merlin. She joined the cast of BBC medical drama Casualty as junior doctor Heather Whitefield, but her character was killed off at the start of her second episode.

In June 2010, she performed in the short play Hens, which ran for four performances at the Riverside Studios and was later broadcast on Sky Arts 2, and played a cameo role in the television drama Thorne: Sleepyhead as the wife of one of the junior detectives (appearing in one scene in episode two, and one non-speaking scene in episode three). In March 2011, she landed the role of Emma in the BBC Three sitcom White Van Man, which ran for two series before being cancelled. In May 2012, Tennant made her West End debut in the play What the Butler Saw at the Vaudeville Theatre in London. The play received poor reviews and ticket sales, and on 13 July the production announced via their official website that the play had been cancelled and would be ending the following week, a month earlier than scheduled.

In November 2013, Tennant appeared in and produced the Doctor Who homage anniversary webcast The Five(ish) Doctors Reboot; as a producer she was credited under her married name of Georgia Tennant (though her initial acting appearances were credited under Georgia Moffett). It was written and directed by her father, and featured cameo appearances by her husband and her two older children (she was at the time of filming heavily pregnant with her third, and the webcast features a scripted scene of her going into labour).

Tennant produced and starred in a short film called 96 Ways To Say I Love You, which also co-starred her husband David Tennant. The film premiered at the London Independent Film Festival in April 2015. In 2017, she returned to acting, appearing in BBC drama miniseries In the Dark, credited as Georgia Tennant. That same year, she produced the comedy film You, Me and Him. Since 2019, she has produced her husband's podcast series David Tennant Does a Podcast With... In 2020, Tennant co-starred and produced the six-part comedy Staged, filmed during the COVID-19 lockdown with her husband and Michael Sheen.

Personal life
Tennant became pregnant after a brief relationship with a university student and in 2002, at age 17, had her first child, a son named Ty, who became an actor.

She became engaged to actor David Tennant in January 2011. She gave birth to the couple's daughter in March 2011. They married on 30 December 2011. The couple live in Chiswick and have three daughters and two sons, including Georgia's firstborn son Ty, whom David Tennant adopted.

Tennant is a patron of Straight Talking, a charity set up to educate young people about teenage pregnancy.

In 2018, Tennant was diagnosed with and successfully treated for early stage cervical cancer.

Filmography

Television

Film

Radio

Stage

References

External links

1984 births
Living people
21st-century English actresses
Actresses from London
English film actresses
English people of American descent
English people of Finnish descent
English people of Guyanese descent
English radio actresses
English stage actresses
English television actresses
English voice actresses
People educated at St Edward's School, Oxford
People from Hammersmith